Khalkhal County is in Ardabil province, Iran. The capital of the county is the city of Khalkhal. At the 2006 census, the county's population was 92,315 in 22,969 households. The following census in 2011 counted 92,332 people in 25,763 households. At the 2016 census, the county's population was 86,731 in 26,779 households.

The majority of Khalkhal county are Azerbaijanis, but there are many Tats and Kurds living in the southern areas of the county, especially in Shahrud District and Khvoresh Rostam District.

Administrative divisions

The population history of Khalkhal County's administrative divisions over three consecutive censuses is shown in the following table. The latest census shows three districts, eight rural districts, and three cities.

Tourist Attractions 

 Lerd tourist village in Shahroud district
 Sibieh Khani Waterfall in Lerd, Shahroud district
 Andabil
 Gilavan
 Neor Lake

References

 

Counties of Ardabil Province